José de San Martín Airport  is an airport with two runways serving the city of José de San Martín in Chubut Province, Argentina, named after José de San Martin, the Argentine General who liberated Argentina from the Spanish empire.

The José de San Martin non-directional beacon (ident: JSM) is located at the field.

See also

 List of airports in Argentina
 Transport in Argentina

References

External links
 HERE Maps - José de San Martín
 OpenStreetMap - José de San Martín
 OurAirports - José de San Martín
 José de San Martín
 Skyvector Aeronautical Charts - José de San Martín

Airports in Argentina